Berwind-White Mine 40 Historic District is a national historic district located at Richland Township and Scalp Level in Cambria County, Pennsylvania. The district includes 121 contributing buildings, 2 contributing sites, and 4 contributing structures.  The district consists of a mine site and patch community associated with the Berwind-White Coal Mining Company's Eureka Mine No. 40, and developed between 1905 and the 1941.   Notable buildings include over 100 two-story, frame miners' double housing, power house (c. 1906, 1929), drift openings, cleaning plant, motor barn (c. 1905, 1940s, 1970s), fan house, sand tank (c. 1928), railroad repair car shop (c. 1925-1930), and wash house (c. 1923, 1930, 1957).

It was listed on the National Register of Historic Places in 1992.

Most of the Eureka No. 40 coal mine complex, except for the power house, was demolished in 2011-12.

References

External links
Eureka No. 40 Photo page

Historic American Engineering Record in Pennsylvania
Historic districts in Cambria County, Pennsylvania
Historic districts on the National Register of Historic Places in Pennsylvania
National Register of Historic Places in Cambria County, Pennsylvania